Amazon Robotics, formerly Kiva Systems, is a Massachusetts-based company that manufactures mobile robotic fulfillment systems. It is a subsidiary company of Amazon.com and its automated storage and retrieval systems were previously used by companies including The Gap, Walgreens, Staples, Gilt Groupe, Office Depot, Crate & Barrel, and Saks 5th Avenue. After those contracts ran out, Amazon did not renew them and Kiva's assets now work only for Amazon's warehouses.

History
After working on the business process team at Webvan, Mick Mountz concluded that the company's downfall was due to the inflexibility of existing material handling systems and the high cost of order fulfillment. These challenges inspired Mountz to create a method to pick, pack, and ship orders through a system that could deliver any item to any operator at any time. To accomplish his vision, Mountz sought help from Peter Wurman and Raffaello D'Andrea. In 2003, Mountz became the founder and CEO of Kiva Systems, through his partnership with co-founders Wurman and D'Andrea.

Overview
Traditionally, goods are moved around a distribution center using a conveyor system or by human-operated machines (such as forklifts). In Kiva's approach, items are stored in portable storage units. When an order is entered into the Kiva database system, the software locates the closest automated guided vehicle (bot) to the item and directs it to retrieve it. The mobile robots navigate around the warehouse by following a series of computerized bar-code stickers on the floor. Each drive unit has a sensor that prevents it from colliding with others. When the drive unit reaches the target location, it slides underneath the pod and lifts it off the ground through a corkscrew action. The robot then carries the pod to the specified human operator to pick up the items.

Kiva sold systems based on two different robot models. The smaller model was approximately 2 feet by 2.5 feet, 18 inches high, and capable of lifting 1,000 pounds. The larger model was capable of carrying a pallet with loads as heavy as 3,000 pounds. Both were a distinctive orange color. The maximum velocity of the robots was 1.3 meters per second. The mobile bots were battery-powered and need to be recharged every hour for five minutes.

The system is considered much more efficient and accurate than the traditional method of having human workers traveling around the warehouse locating and picking items.

Acquisition by Amazon

In March 2012, Amazon.com acquired Kiva Systems for $775 million. At the time, this was Amazon's second-largest acquisition in its history.

Since the acquisition by Amazon, Kiva has remained silent. The company has not announced any new Kiva customers and has stopped its marketing activities. Most of Kiva's sales staff have departed, though the company continues to hire in the engineering and manufacturing departments. Industry observers speculate that Amazon is focusing on internal operations and is not interested in sharing the technology with competitors.

In August 2015, the company officially changed its name from Kiva Systems LLC to Amazon Robotics LLC.

As of June 2019, Amazon had more than 200,000 robots working in their warehouses.

In July 2022, Amazon unveiled its first-ever autonomous mobile robot (AMR) Proteus.

See also
 Automated retailing
 Automation
 Robotics
 Warehouse
 Logistics automation
Amazon Scout

References

External links
 Amazon Robotics official website
 Demonstration video
 Exclusive From Gilt Groupe: Flash Sales, Flash Delivery, Apparel Magazine
 "Disruptive By Design: Freakin' Cool Robots", Wired Magazine
 Toys 'R' Us Deploys Robots as Retailers Seek to Catch Amazon, Bloomberg.com
 Robots: Warehouse Robots podcast
 Staples Robotic Retrievers by Internet Archive

Robotics companies of the United States
Warehouses
Amazon (company) acquisitions